Manangatang is a railway station located on the Robinvale railway line in the town of Manangatang in Victoria, Australia. If not for heritage funds, the station would have been demolished. Today the station is preserved by  funding grants.

External links 

Disused railway stations in Victoria (Australia)
Listed railway stations in Australia
Victorian Heritage Register Loddon Mallee (region)
Rural City of Swan Hill